CDW Corporation, headquartered in Lincolnshire, Illinois, is a provider of technology products and services for business, government and education. The company has a secondary division known as CDW-G, devoted solely to United States governmental entities, such as K-12 schools, universities, non-profit healthcare organizations, State & Local and the Federal government.

History
CDW was originally incorporated in 1984 as "MPK Computing" by its founder Michael Krasny. The idea was born when Krasny took a small ad in a free-circulation newspaper to sell his computer and printer. It later became Computer Discount Warehouse and then simply CDW.

In early 2006, CDW opened a  distribution center in North Las Vegas, Nevada. In October 2006 CDW acquired Berbee, a top tier reseller of IBM, Cisco, and Microsoft products and services. It was CDW's second major acquisition after purchasing Micro Warehouse in September 2003.

On 12 October 2007, Chicago based private equity firms Madison Dearborn Partners and Providence Equity Partners completed a $7 billion acquisition of CDW. It went public again through an initial public offering on the NASDAQ market on July 2, 2013, under the name CDW Corporation (the parent company since 2010). CDW LLC and CDW Finance Corporation are wholly owned subsidiaries.

CDW operates in Canada as CDW Canada Incorporated, based in Etobicoke, Ontario. CDW Canada was recognized by the Great Place to Work Institute as one of the best workplaces in Canada in 2011, ranked 25th in the category of large and multinational companies.

On 3 August 2015 the company announced that it had acquired the remaining 65 percent of Kelway Ltd., a London based multinational business with significant presence in the IT sector. Eight months earlier, CDW had bought a 35 percent stake in Kelway.

As of 2018, CDW ranked 189th on the Fortune 500 list of the largest United States corporations by revenue.

In 2005, CDW launched BizTech magazine, which it publishes on quarterly basis.

In 2021, CDW announced the acquisition of Sirius Computer Solutions, Inc. The acquisition was completed later that year.

Berbee Information Networks Corporation
Berbee Information Networks Corporation, an American company specializing in IT, was purchased by CDW in 2006. Prior to that it was a privately held company headquartered in Fitchburg, Wisconsin. Berbee was founded in 1993 by James G. Berbee and grew to over 300 million USD in revenue and more than 800 employees. Berbee's IT solutions included network infrastructure, systems and storage, productivity applications, communication and collaboration, application development, and security. Its data centers delivered hosted applications, co-location, and managed services. Berbee had offices in Illinois, Indiana, Michigan, Minnesota, Ohio, and Wisconsin. In October 2006, Berbee accepted an $175 million all-cash acquisition offer from CDW. It became a division of CDW and is now known as CDW Advanced Technology Services. The Berbee Voice-Over IP software product group, creator of the InformaCast family of IP notification solutions, was spun off to form the new company Singlewire Software in April, 2009.

Non-profit 
CDW Non-Profit, a sector founded in 2007, assists in providing affordable technology tools and services to associations, foundations, governmental departments, religious and social service organizations. The Brookings Institution, Salvation Army, PCAOB, Aids Healthcare Foundation, The Metropolitan Museum of Art and American Heart Association are some of their clients.

References

External links
Official Website

Technology companies established in 1984
Companies based in Vernon Hills, Illinois
Companies listed on the Nasdaq
2013 initial public offerings